Paired box protein Pax-1 is a protein that in humans is encoded by the PAX1 gene.

Function 
This gene is a member of the paired box (PAX) family of transcription factors which are essential during fetal development. It is required for the development of the ventral vertebral column. Its expression is limited to the pharyngeal pouches and the cells that surround the developing vertebrae near the top where the head will be established to help give rise to the neck and the start of the formation of the shoulders and arm buds. Cancers, such as ovarian and cervical cancers, add a methyl (CH3) group which silences, or disables, the gene which may be able to suppress the tumor by regulating when other cells divide and increase. A substitution or deletion of this gene in mice can produce variants of the mutant undulated which is characterized by segmentation abnormalities along the inner spine.  Mutations in the human gene may contribute to the condition of Klippel–Feil syndrome, which is the failure of the vertebrae to segment near the top of the spine and possibly further down with symptoms including a short, immovable neck and a low hairline on the back of the head.

Interactions 
PAX1 has been shown to interact with MEOX1 and MEOX2.

See also 
 Pax genes

References

Further reading

External links 
 

Transcription factors